

The Bleriot-SPAD S.30 was a French sports aircraft built in the early 1920s.

Design
The S.30 was a biplane with a monocoque fuselage of wood and canvas construction. It was the first French aircraft to be built and equipped with a NACA cover. In September 1920, after initial flight tests, it was re-engined with a Le Rhone engine and redesignated S.30bis.

Specifications

See also

References

SPAD aircraft
Biplanes
Single-engined tractor aircraft
Aircraft first flown in 1920